This is a list of the members of the Australian House of Representatives in the 11th Australian Parliament, which was elected at the 1928 election on 17 November 1928. The incumbent Nationalist Party of Australia led by Prime Minister of Australia Stanley Bruce in power since 1922 with coalition partner the Country Party led by Earle Page defeated the opposition Australian Labor Party led by Matthew Charlton.

Notes

References

Members of Australian parliaments by term
20th-century Australian politicians